The Turginskaya Svita is an Early Cretaceous period geologic formation located in Russia. Dinosaur remains were recovered from it as early as 1915, including partial theropod remains.

Paleofauna
Theropoda (previously informally known as Allosaurus? sibiricus, Antrodemus? sibiricus and currently known as Chilantaisaurus? sibiricus)

See also

 List of dinosaur-bearing rock formations
 List of stratigraphic units with few dinosaur genera

References

Mesozoic Erathem of Europe